Miyantang-e Mansuri (also Romanized as Mīyāntang-e Manṣūrī) is a village in Mansuri Rural District, Homeyl District, Eslamabad-e Gharb County, Kermanshah Province, Iran. At the 2006 census, its population was 189, in 45 families.

References 

Populated places in Eslamabad-e Gharb County